Lewis M. Steel (born April 25, 1937) is a civil rights attorney and author who was co-lead counsel of the legal team that freed the boxer Rubin Carter and John Artis after they were wrongly convicted of murder. While working for the NAACP during the 1960s, he worked to desegregate public schools in the North. In 1971 he joined other civil rights lawyers, including William Kunstler, and New York Times columnist Tom Wicker to try to negotiate a settlement of the Attica Prison riot. He was the lead attorney in Avagliano v. Sumitomo Shoji America, 457 U.S. 176 (1982) which established that American subsidiaries of foreign corporations must obey American civil rights laws. He continues working as a civil rights attorney at the New York law firm Outten & Golden LLP, with a special focus on lawsuits that address barriers that make it difficult for formerly incarcerated people to secure employment.

Early life and education 
Steel was born and raised in New York City. His paternal grandmother, Bessie Levy Warner, was a daughter of Moe Levy, who owned an eponymous chain of successful clothing stores. After her first husband died, she married the film executive Albert Warner, who was one of the Warner Brothers. Steel attended Culver Military Academy, Harvard College - where he co-founded the Harvard Opera Guild and produced operas with his lifelong friend, the critic Peter G. Davis - and New York Law School, where he was editor in chief of the law review.

National Association for the Advancement of Colored People 
After law school Steel volunteered to work for the NAACP legal staff and then was hired by NAACP general counsel Robert L. Carter, who won 21 race related cases in the U.S. Supreme Court including Brown v. Board of Education (1954). While Brown repudiated the racial doctrine of separate but equal established in Plessy v. Ferguson (1896), the South and the North resisted integration and the courts required civil rights attorneys to demonstrate that the segregation in place was intentional. In his trials, Steel helped develop Carter's legal theory that used psychological evidence to show that school segregation, whether intentional or not, severely damaged Black children, in cases in Cincinnati, Ohio and Kokomo, Indiana. Steel also used that theory and type of evidence in winning a case against Governor James A. Rhodes of Ohio that required public projects using union construction workers to include blacks.
On Oct. 13, 1968 the New York Times Magazine published the controversial article he wrote, "Nine Men in Black Who Think White" which argued that "historically, the Supreme Court has been the enemy of the American black man." Steel contended that, after Brown, the Court slowly retreated on numerous racial issues, leaving most Southern school segregation in place, declining to take on northern racial segregation, allowing injunctions preventing peaceful racial demonstrations and ignoring the misuse of urban renewal federal funds which were supposed to rebuild cities but were used instead to construct highways isolating Blacks. On the day of publication, the NAACP board of directors, in a split vote, with Executive Director Roy Wilkins recommending termination, Steel was subsequently fired. In response, Carter, who lauded Steel's work as well as his article, resigned in protest along with his entire legal staff and stated that he believed that the NAACP board had fired Steel because it felt the legal department was taking on cases that were too controversial.

Private practice 
In the decades that followed Steel pursued civil rights cases in private practice in New York City, at DiSuvero, Meyers, Obermen and Steel, and then at Eisner Levy and Steel LLP. In 1980 he and his colleague from the NAACP, who was Steel's closest professional colleague and friend, Richard Bellman (who was an uncle of Rep. Jamie Raskin), started the civil rights firm Steel and Bellman PC, and later added Susan Ritz and Miriam Clark as partners. The firm took on a wide range of cases, involving discrimination in housing and employment; they freed the wrongfully accused from jail, and pushed for prison reform. The firm represented plaintiffs in a class action lawsuit that alleged racial discrimination in the hiring and promotion of black and Hispanic workers by the New York City Parks Department. The suit, Wright v. Stern, was settled in 2006 when the Parks Department agreed to pay more than $21 million in damages and fees. After Steel Bellman Ritz & Clark disbanded in 2006, Steel joined Outten & Golden, where he is now senior counsel. He also serves as general counsel for the Institute for Policy Studies.

Attica 
In 1971 Steel, who was a vice-president of the National Lawyers Guild New York City Chapter, went to Attica Correctional Facility as one of the outside observers trying to prevent the prison authorities from engaging in a bloody attack on the prisoners who controlled a large yard where they held guards and prison workers as hostages. Steel also wanted to protect a client there, William A. "Tony" Maynard, a friend of the writers, James Baldwin and William Styron who was serving a manslaughter sentence Steel would later get overturned. At Attica, the observers soon realized that it was not only their job to observe, but to try to negotiate a settlement, which would help resolve some of their complaints ‒ including harsh treatment, bad food, poor medical care, frequent use of solitary confinement and lack of representations at prison hearings.
While the prison yard was still in the hands of more than 800 prisoners and their hostage guards and workers, Steel obtained an agreement that the prisoners would not be charged with any property related crimes. Reflecting on the legacy of Attica in a 2016 article in the Nation, Steel wrote that the carnage due to the prison yard attack ordered by Gov. Nelson Rockefeller did not lead to reform. "Federal law also turned repressive over the years, with much higher mandatory minimum sentences, especially for the drug crimes involving persons of color, and Congress significantly limited the circumstances in which the federal courts could intervene to require remedies for prison conditions which violated the constitution's Eighth Amendment prohibiting cruel and unusual punishment." Steel also discussed his experience in the Academy Award nominated documentary Attica (2021).

Hurricane Carter and John Artis 
In 1973, Steel, with his co-lead counsel, Myron Beldock, began a twelve-year struggle, working without pay, to overturn the convictions of the middleweight boxer Rubin "Hurricane" Carter and John Artis who had been convicted for the murder of three people at a Patterson, N.J. bar in 1966. The case drew national attention through Carter's 1974 biography, "The Sixteenth Round," and Bob Dylan's 1976 song Hurricane. The New Jersey Supreme Court overturned their conviction in 1976, after two key witnesses recanted their testimony. But they were convicted at a retrial in which the prosecutor added an unsupported claim that their motive was racial revenge. In response to a writ of habeas corpus filed by Steel, Beldock and Leon Friedman, U.S. District Court Judge H. Lee Sarokin overturned their convictions in 1985, ruling that that the cases had rested on "an appeal to racism rather than reason" and "concealment rather than disclosure".
In 2000, Steel wrote a commentary in the Los Angeles Times criticizing the film, "The Hurricane" starring Denzel Washington, for transforming Carter's "painful story into a series of false cliches: He was jailed because of one racist cop; he was freed through the efforts of a commune of white people. In reality, Carter was ensnared by an entire criminal justice system. … Along with Myron Beldock and Leon Friedman, I spent more than a decade representing Rubin Carter and his co-defendant, John Artis, fighting to expose police-created false evidence, prosecutorial misconduct and judicial acceptance of a trial by race rather than fact. During years of appeals through the New Jersey state court system in the late 1970s and '80s, not one of the more than 20 state court judges who reviewed the case was willing to confront the racism behind the unproven accusation that Carter and Artis murdered three randomly chosen whites to avenge an earlier killing of a black man by a white man".

Sumitomo Shoji America Inc. (SSA) 
In 1982, Steel represented a group of female employees working for the American subsidiary of the multi-national Japanese firm, Sumitomo, in the United States. The women asserted that they were always treated and paid as clericals despite their responsibilities and that they had no opportunity for advancement because of their sex in violation of U.S. anti-discrimination law. The case, Sumitomo Shoji America, Inc. v. Avagliano, reached the U.S. Supreme Court, where Steel won a 9-0 decision that established the precedent that American subsidiaries of foreign companies operating in the U.S. must abide by U.S. anti-discrimination laws.

Later work 
In 2017, Steel was part of the Outten & Golden team that claimed the U.S. Census Bureau's reliance on criminal arrest records when hiring temporary workers to conduct the decennial count had a substantial disparate impact on more than 400,000 African American and Hispanic job applicants in violation of Title VII, the federal law prohibiting discrimination in the workplace. Their successful class action suit in Gonzalez v. Pritzker resulted in a court approved settlement that led the Bureau to overhaul its hiring process and provide $5 million for a program through the New York State School of Industrial and Labor Relations at Cornell University and the Lawyers' Committee for Civil Rights Under Law that helps people with criminal records increase their employment prospects. As a result, Steel and other members of the Outten & Golden team were named Trial Lawyer of the Year in 2017 by the advocacy group Public Justice. Steel continues to work at Outten & Golden where he focuses on helping formerly incarcerated people with clean records secure employment; helping pre-trail detainees being held in private prisons to earn a fair wage for their labor; and helping "gig" workers secure employee benefits.

The Butler's Child 
In 2016, Thomas Dunne Books/St. Martin's Press published "The Butler's Child," Steel's autobiography (written with Beau Friedlander) about his experiences growing up in the Warner Brothers family, and his experiences as a civil rights attorney. The University of South Carolina Press republished the book with an new subtitle, "The Butler's Child: White Privilege, Race, and a Lawyer's Life in Civil Rights," and an epilogue by Steel in 2020. Harvard University historian and filmmaker Henry Louis Gates Jr. wrote that, "The breadth of Steel's legal activism over the last half century, as revealed in this remarkable memoir, reminds us of the challenges that loomed in the wake of the Civil Rights gains of the 1960s: the campaign to end northern school segregation; ongoing battles against unemployment, under-employment, and housing discrimination: the pervasive problems of police brutality and a deeply flawed criminal justice system. His compelling, first-hand account of the Attica prison uprising and ensuing massacre sheds fresh light on one of the great tragedies of the "Post Civil Rights" era. A child of privilege, Steel has lived a life dedicated to the pursuit of racial justice, and has written a memoir that is timely, essential and deeply inspiring".

Personal life 
Steel married Kitty Muldoon Steel, Ph.D. in 1961. They have three children, Janine, Brian, and Patrick, who was a former CEO of Politico. Steel's brother, John Howard Steel, is a lawyer and former mayor of Telluride, Co. who wrote the book "Caged Lion: Joseph Pilates and His Legacy".

References 

1937 births
Living people
Harvard College alumni
New York Law School alumni